Infernax is a 2D Metroidvania developed by Berzerk Studio and published by The Arcade Crew. It was released on February 14, 2022 for Nintendo Switch, PlayStation 4, Windows, Xbox One, Xbox Series X/S. The game follows the young Duke Alcedor, who finds his village overrun by monsters upon returning from the Crusades. Infernax received generally favorable reviews.

Gameplay 

Infernax is a 2D Metroidvania game where the player controls the young Duke Alcedor, who finds his village overrun by monsters upon returning from the Crusades. The player wields a shield and mace, which can be upgraded as the player progresses through the game. Players can also obtain a variety of magical spells, with some of which can be upgraded. Alcedor earns gold and experience points whenever he defeats an enemy. Gold is used to buy upgrades for equipment, while earning enough experience points allows players to increase their health, mana, or attack power.

In Infernax, villages are places where players can accept quests and buy items from shops. Villages and their residents are also affected by the choices that players make throughout the game. The goal of Infernax is to defeat the enemies within five different castles and destroy the gems inside of them. Once the player destroys all five gems, the last castle is unlocked, containing the final boss of the game. Infernax features multiple endings, with the player's actions determining the ending they receive.

Development 
Infernax was developed by Canadian game studio Berzerk Studio. The game was originally designed as an online Flash game. The game was crowdfunded through Kickstarter in 2015. In January 2020, a game demo of Infernax was released at PAX South 2020, revealing the overall plot of the game. Infernax was officially announced through a trailer on October 21, 2021, with a release date of Q1 2022 on PC and consoles. On January 11, 2022, The Arcade Crew released a trailer, revealing the game's release date of February 14, 2022. On February 14, 2022, Infernax released for Nintendo Switch, PlayStation 4, Windows, Xbox One, and Xbox Series X/S. The game was also added to the Xbox Game Pass library on the same day.

Infernax was primarily influenced by Zelda II: The Adventure of Link and Castlevania II: Simon's Quest, but also took inspiration from the accounts of knights such as Jean de Joinville and historical accounts from the Battle of Agincourt. The team also drew inspiration from the heavy metal genre, influenced by bands such as Mercyful Fate to "fit the feeling we wanted for the game".

Reception 

Infernax received "generally favorable" reviews according to review aggregator Metacritic.

Hardcore Gamer's James Cunningham described Infernax as a "fantastic throwback to 8-bit gaming". Cunningham stated that the difficulty of the game was appealing, writing that Infernax "knows when to go hard and when to back off".

Shaun Musgrave of TouchArcade praised the solid gameplay mechanics, and said that the fundamentals were "done properly". Musgrave recommended the game to those who enjoyed exploratory 2D platformers. Jordan Rudek from Nintendo World Report gave the game a 9/10, calling the game's pacing "excellent" and the gameplay "simple, but fun". However, Rudek criticized the initial difficulty curve of the game, and said that boss fights "seem much easier than some of the platforming". Game Informer's Wesley LeBlanc scored the game an 8/10, commending the uniqueness of the bosses, the challenging gameplay, describing it as a "fun Castlevania-inspired design". However, LeBlanc felt that the layout of some of the dungeons was frustrating.

Destructoid reviewer Chris Moyse rated the game 8/10, praising the game's challenge, the chiptune score, and the visuals, describing them as "neat". Moyse criticized the slim cast of characters, and the game's story, calling it "relatively thin". Stuart Gipp of Nintendo Life lauded the game's challenge, the visuals, and the Metroidvania structure of the game. Gipp felt that familiarity let Infernax down, but wrote that it was done in a way that "you won't really care unless you're desperate for a completely fresh experience".

References

External links 
Official website

2022 video games
Metroidvania games
Kickstarter-funded video games
Nintendo Switch games
PlayStation 4 games
Retro-style video games
Single-player video games
 Indie video games
Video games with alternate endings
Video games developed in Canada
Windows games
Xbox One games
Xbox Series X and Series S games
The Arcade Crew games